The Fannin County School District is a public school district in Fannin County, Georgia, United States, based in Blue Ridge. It serves the communities of Blue Ridge, McCaysville, and Morganton.

Schools
The Fannin County School District has three elementary schools, one middle school, and one high school.

Elementary schools
Blue Ridge Elementary School
East Fannin Elementary School
West Fannin Elementary School

Middle school
Fannin County Middle School

High school
Fannin County High School

References

External links

School districts in Georgia (U.S. state)
Education in Fannin County, Georgia